Jason David Williams (born September 10, 1981) is an American former basketball player and television analyst. He played college basketball for the Duke Blue Devils men's basketball team and professionally for the Chicago Bulls in the NBA. 

Then known as Jason Williams, he won the 2001 NCAA Championship with Duke, and was named NABC Player of the Year in 2001 and 2002. He was drafted second overall in the 2002 NBA Draft by the Bulls. He asked to be called Jay on joining the Bulls, to avoid confusion with two other players in the NBA at the time. His playing career was effectively ended by a motorcycle accident in 2003. He last signed with the Austin Toros of the NBA Development League, but was waived on December 30, 2006, due to lingering physical effects from his accident.

Since retiring, he has worked as an analyst for ESPN, initially working on ESPN College Basketball. In 2019, however, Williams was reassigned to the NBA full-time with his addition on ESPN's NBA Countdown program.

High school
Williams grew up in Plainfield, New Jersey, and attended St. Joseph High School in Metuchen, graduating in 1999. He not only excelled at basketball, but took an active interest in other activities, most notably chess. His nickname in high school was "Jay Dubs." Williams also played junior varsity soccer during his freshman year and was the state volleyball player of the year during his senior year. In basketball that year, Williams was named a First Team All-State Player in New Jersey, the New Jersey Player of the Year, a Parade All-American, a USA Today first team All-American, and a McDonald's All-American, where he competed in the Slam Dunk Contest and the McDonald's All-American Game, scoring 20 points in the contest. In his last year of high school he averaged 19 points, 7.0 assists, 4.2 rebounds and 3.7 steals per game; he had started each of the 4 years he spent at St. Joseph, and set school records in total points (1,977) and steals (407). He was also named the recipient of the 1999 Morgan Wootten Award for his basketball achievements and his work in the classroom, where he maintained a 3.6 GPA.

College career
He was also a first team Freshman All-American by Basketball Times.

The next season Williams started all 39 games and led the Devils to the 2001 NCAA National Championship, earning NABC Player of the Year honors. His 841 points broke Dick Groat's 49-year Duke record for points in a season, while he led all tournament scorers with a 25.7 points per game average. Williams also set the NCAA Tournament record for three-pointers attempted (66), while also making 132 three-point field goals—good for the sixth-highest total in NCAA history. His 21.6 points per game led the ACC and made him the first Duke player since Danny Ferry (1989) to lead the league in scoring. His 6.1 assists were good for second in the league, while he also ranked second in three-point field goal percentage (.427) and first in three-pointers made (3.4 per game). Williams was widely considered the best player in college basketball, earning both the prestigious Naismith Award and Wooden Award as College Basketball's Player of the Year in 2002. He graduated with a degree in Sociology in 2002, and left Duke with 2,079 points, good for sixth all-time, and with his jersey number 22 retired at Senior Day.

He had 36 double-figure scoring games in a single season (tied for 5th-most in Duke history as of March 28, 2010, with Jon Scheyer, Shane Battier, and JJ Redick).

In 2001–02, Williams, Carlos Boozer, and Mike Dunleavy Jr. each scored at least 600 points for the season, a feat only matched at Duke by Jon Scheyer, Kyle Singler, and Nolan Smith in the 2009–10 season. Williams (841) and Shane Battier (778) on the 2001 national championship team were one of only two Duke duos to each score over 700 points in a season, the other duo being Scheyer (728) and Singler (707) in the 2009–10 season.

Professional career

Chicago Bulls (2002–2004) 
Williams was selected by the Chicago Bulls with the second overall pick in the 2002 NBA draft, after Yao Ming was selected by the Houston Rockets. Williams was a starter in the Bulls' line-up for most of the 2002–03 NBA season. Although his performance was inconsistent and he competed for playing time with Jamal Crawford, he showed signs of promise, including posting a triple-double in a win over the New Jersey Nets. Williams' final NBA game was played on April 15, 2003, in a 115–106 win over the Philadelphia 76ers in which he recorded 14 points, 7 assists, 2 rebounds, and 1 steal.

Motorcycle accident
On the night of June 19, 2003, Williams was riding a motorcycle at a fast speed on the North Side of Chicago. He crashed his Yamaha YZF-R6 motorcycle into a streetlight at the intersection of Belmont Avenue and Honore Street in the Roscoe Village neighborhood. Williams was not wearing a helmet, nor was he licensed to ride a motorcycle in Illinois, and he was also violating the terms of his NBA Bulls contract by riding a motorcycle. Williams' injuries included a fractured pelvis, a severed main nerve in his leg, and three torn ligaments in his left knee, including the ACL. He required lengthy physical therapy to regain the use of his leg. A week after the motorcycle crash, the Bulls drafted point guard Kirk Hinrich. When it became clear Williams would not be returning to the Bulls for a long time, if at all, because of his severe injuries, the Bulls chose to waive him and drop him from the roster. This left the team without their top draft pick just from a year prior. Legally, the Bulls did not have to pay Williams any remaining salary at all because his severe injuries occurred while he violated the terms of his contract by riding a motorcycle; however, the Bulls organization decided to give Williams $3 million when they waived him so Williams could use the funds toward his rehabilitation expenses. Williams apologized to the Bulls organization for violating the terms of his contract and severely injuring himself. He stated at the time that he would work hard in his physical rehabilitation so that he could make a return to the Bulls. In his 2016 memoir, he mentioned that he became addicted to illegal painkillers as well as other drugs after the accident. Years after the accident, he appeared in college and high school basketball broadcasts on the ESPN network as a commentator.

Austin Toros (2006)
On September 28, 2006, the New Jersey Nets announced that they had signed Williams to a non-guaranteed contract. However, on October 22, the Nets released him.

Williams then signed with the Austin Toros of the NBA Development League, but he played in just three games for the club. On December 30, 2006, the Toros waived him due to injury. Williams subsequently announced that he had no plans to resume his basketball career.

National team career
During his basketball playing career, Williams also represented the senior USA national basketball team. He was a part of the US team that finished in 6th place at the 2002 FIBA World Cup, which was held in Indianapolis. In seven games played during the tournament, Williams averaged 3.9 points, 1.0 rebounds, 1.6 assists, and 0.9 steals, in 6.6 minutes per game.

Post-basketball career
Williams works for ESPN as an NBA analyst. Previously, Williams covered college basketball for the network. He has also done motivational speaking and worked as an analyst on CBS College Sports Network during the 2008 NCAA men's basketball tournament. He was a recruiter for sports agency Ceruzzi Sports and Entertainment from 2007 to 2009. In 2016, Williams released his autobiography, Life Is Not an Accident: A Memoir of Reinvention. Presently, Williams is the Spokesperson of Visions Federal Credit Union, headquartered in Endwell, New York. He was also an announcer in NBA Live 19.

According to a May 2020 article on BlackEnterprise.com, Williams co-founded a management consulting company named Simatree, serves as a partial owner of The CabinNYC restaurant, works as an advisor to a digital marketing agency, and partners with EPIC Insurance to provide financial guidance to athletes and celebrities.

In 2021, Williams began hosting a podcast series titled The Limits with Jay Williams for NPR.

He also co-hosts the "Keyshawn, JWill & Max Show" national morning show on ESPN Radio, with Keyshawn Johnson and Max Kellerman.

Personal life
Jay is a cousin of former NFL wide receiver David Tyree.

He is married to Nikki Bonacorsi and is the father of one daughter, Amelia, and one son, Zane.

Career statistics

NBA

Regular season

|-
| style="text-align:left;"|
| style="text-align:left;"|Chicago
| 75 || 54 || 26.1 || .399 || .322 || .640 || 2.6 || 4.7 || 1.1 || .2 || 9.5

College

|-
| style="text-align:left;"|1999–00
| style="text-align:left;"|Duke
| 34 || 34 || 34.0 || .419 || .354 || .685 || 4.2 || 6.5 || 2.4 || .2 || 14.5
|-
| style="text-align:left;"|2000–01
| style="text-align:left;"|Duke
| 39 || 39 || 31.8 || .473 || .427 || .659 || 3.3 || 6.1 || 2.0 || .1 || 21.6
|-
| style="text-align:left;"|2001–02
| style="text-align:left;"|Duke
| 35 || 35 || 33.6 || .457 || .383 || .676 || 3.5 || 5.3 || 2.2 || .1 || 21.3
|- class="sortbottom"
| style="text-align:center;" colspan="2"|Career
| 108 || 108 || 33.1 || .453 || .393 || .671 || 3.7 || 6.0 || 2.2 || .1 || 19.3

References

External links

 Blog written by Williams at NBA.com
 Oscar Robertson Trophy 2002 College Basketball Player of the Year
 

1981 births
Living people
2002 FIBA World Championship players
African-American basketball players
African-American sports journalists
All-American college men's basketball players
American men's basketball players
Austin Toros players
Basketball players from New Jersey
Chicago Bulls draft picks
Chicago Bulls players
College basketball announcers in the United States
Disney people
Duke Blue Devils men's basketball players
ESPN people
McDonald's High School All-Americans
Parade High School All-Americans (boys' basketball)
Point guards
Sportspeople from Plainfield, New Jersey
St. Joseph High School (Metuchen, New Jersey) alumni
United States men's national basketball team players